Fox Deportes (formerly Fox Sports en Español and stylized in all caps as FOX Deportes) is an American pay television network dedicated to broadcasting sports-related programming in Spanish, aimed at the Hispanic population in the United States. Launched in 1993, Fox Deportes, a division of Fox Sports, is the first and longest-running Spanish-language sports network in the country.

Fox Deportes features a diversified programming, including NFL pre and post-season games, MLB regular-season, All-Star Game, Divisional Series, National League Championship Series and World Series, the USGA's U.S. Open, NASCAR, Premier Boxing Champions, college football and soccer competitions including Liga MX and MLS.

The channel first launched in Southern California as La Cadena Deportiva Prime Ticket, a sister network to the original Prime Ticket regional sports network (the present day Bally Sports West), on November 1, 1993.  The network was renamed Prime Deportiva on April 1, 1995 to align with the rebranding of Liberty Media-owned regional sports networks with the "Prime Sports" brand.  After News Corporation (NewsCorp) formed a 50-50 sports television joint venture with Liberty Media, NewsCorp rebranded the network Fox Sports Américas on October 1, 1996.  The network was rebranded Fox Sports World Español in February 1999 to align with the recently launched (November 1997) English-language soccer centric network Fox Sports World. In 2002, the network was rebranded as Fox Sports en Español before becoming Fox Deportes on October 1, 2010.

As of February 2015, approximately 21,831,000 American households (18.8% of households with television) received Fox Deportes.

Programming

Association Football
The network holds rights to international football including MLS, Liga MX and Liga MX Femenil (matches hosted by CF Monterrey, FC Juárez, Santos Laguna and Club Tijuana). During the 2018 FIFA World Cup, it carried replays of Fox's English-language coverage of the tournament.

American football
The network began to carry simulcasts of some Fox College Football games in 2013 with Spanish play-by-play and graphics, and starting with the 2013 Thanksgiving Game on Fox, also carries select NFL games from the NFL on Fox package featuring Spanish-language play-by-play and graphics, including Fox's NFC playoffs package (Fox continues to carry all NFL games with Spanish-language play-by-play via the SAP channel, regardless of a game also airing on Fox Deportes). The network also carried Super Bowl XLVIII, a first for a Spanish-language sports network in the United States, and has continued to carry Super Bowls in years the Fox broadcast network holds the rights to the game.

Baseball
The network also serves as the Spanish-language home to Major League Baseball, including the MLB All-Star Game, American and National League Championship Series (AL odd years, NL even years) and World Series. Although the Fox network itself has expanded the availability of SAP audio since the start of 2012 to expand the availability of audio description of primetime programming and Spanish language audio to their NFL package, Fox Sports has chosen to retain Spanish audio of their MLB coverage exclusively on Fox Deportes for the time being.

Auto Racing
On October 9, 2010, Fox Deportes picked up Spanish language rights to Formula One coverage, a contract which ran through 2012.
In August 2012, NASCAR and Fox Deportes made a deal to have Fox Deportes Broadcast 15 races, 6 of them live, one of which is the Daytona 500.

Professional wrestling
As of October 2019, Fox Deportes holds the Spanish language rights to WWE's Friday Night SmackDown, which is aired in a live simulcast with Fox.

Sports news and talk
Total Sports 360 - Nightly news program produced at MEDIAPRO Mexico in Mexico City covers sports events that are of interest to Hispanics living in the U.S.  

Punto Final - Nightly debate program produced at MEDIAPRO Mexico in Mexico City.  FOX Deportes commentators and reporters based in Los Angeles, California, USA; as well as Juárez, Monterrey, Tijuana, and Torreón, Mexico will appear as needed.

El Chiringuito de Jugones - Fox Deportes in the United States holds the rights to this Spain-based nightly soccer talk show from Atresmedia's Mega, which focuses on coverage of the domestic La Liga and overall European soccer.

Ratings
 2011 UEFA Champions League Final: 1.57 million
 Super Bowl XLVIII: 561,000
 2015 UEFA Champions League Final: 1.45 million
 2015 Copa Libertadores finals (second leg): 979,000
 2016 World Series Game 7: 565,000
 Super Bowl LI: 650,000 (non-soccer record)
 2017 UEFA Champions League Final: 1.24 million

References

External links

Fox Corporation subsidiaries
Prime Sports
Español
Soccer on United States television
Spanish-language television networks in the United States
Television channels and stations established in 1996
1996 establishments in the United States